Buonanotte Bettina is a play by Italian playwrights Pietro Garinei and . It is set in Turin on 14 November 1956. An English version, titled When in Rome, was given at Adelphi Theater in London in 1959.  There's also a Spanish version, set in Teatro de la Comedia of Madrid on 31 December 1958.

Synopsis
Andrea's father and Nicoletta's mother, as well as characters, are narrators of the whole story, hiding or revealing a latent attraction between them.

The manuscript of a novel entitled "Buonanotte Bettina" is accidentally found, abandoned in a taxi, by the Roman editor Colibò. It isn't known whether it is a novel or a masterpiece, whether it is fictional. But the content is, in every matter, hot. With tones ranging from risqué to romance, it tells of the sensual secret meetings between Bettina and the rude truck driver Joe. The editor considers the work a real editorial discovery and is looking for the author. Nicoletta, a young wife sweet and discreet, discovers that her story is becoming an editorial success, and wants to contact Colibò to be recognized as the author.

Andrea, Nicoletta's husband, a bank clerk, does not find himself in Joe so male, and he is shocked by his wife's public image as the author of lustful adventures. He would like her to use a pseudonym, to remain unknown, while suspecting some "autobiography" in the novel, consuming himself in suspicion and jealousy.

Misunderstandings and unforeseen events of all kinds follow, which come together in a rather reassuring ending.

Television adaptation

Bibliography   
 Rita Cirio - Pietro Favari, Sentimental. ll teatro di rivista italiano, Bompiani, 1974
 Mariagabriella Cambiaghi (a cura di), Il teatro di Garinei e Giovannini, Bulzoni Editore, 1999
 Felice Liperi, I padri di Rugantino, Rai Libri, 2001
 Lello Garinei - Marco Giovannini, Quarant'anni di teatro musicale all'italiana, Rizzoli, 1985
 Pietro Garinei, Tutto G&G – Il meglio della commedia musicale, Gremese, 1996
 Morando Morandini, Sessappiglio. Gli anni d'oro del teatro di rivista, Il Formichiere, 1978

References

1956 plays
Italian plays
Italian comedy television series
Italian musicals